Love Songs: A Compilation... Old and New is a compilation album by English musician Phil Collins. The album was released by Atlantic Recording Corporation and Rhino Entertainment on 28 September 2004. The album was released only a few months after the compilation album The Platinum Collection.

The album was compiled of recordings released on previous albums as well as several previously unreleased songs, including a rehearsal take and live recordings.

Background, compilation and songs 
The concept of Love Songs had existed since 2000. In that year, Collins and producer Rob Cavallo recorded the songs "Can't Stop Loving You," "Tears of a Clown" and "Least You Can Do" for inclusion in the compilation. However, the album did not see release and the songs were remixed and included on the 2002 studio album, Testify.

The songs on Love Songs were compiled by Geoff Callingham with the track listing being approved by Phil Collins. Several of the recordings—"I've Forgotten Everything," "This Must Be Love," —on the album were sped-up by several beats per minute, while none of the songs were remixed from their original albums.

Track listing 
All songs written and composed by Phil Collins, except where indicated.

Disc one
"Tearing and Breaking" (lyrics: John Martyn, Collins; music: John Martyn) – 5:32
 A previously unreleased song from the Testify sessions, used as the radio promo single for the album.
"Do You Remember?" –  4:36
 From the album ...But Seriously, and an American Top 5 hit single in 1990.
"One More Night" – 4:49
 From the album No Jacket Required, and a #1 single in the U.S. in 1985. The version on this compilation is a remix.
"Against All Odds (Take a Look at Me Now)" – 3:28
 From the Against All Odds Motion Picture Soundtrack, and a #1 single in the U.S. in 1984.
"Can't Turn Back the Years" – 4:38
 From the album Both Sides, only released as a promo single in 1994.
"A Groovy Kind of Love" (Toni Wine, Carole Bayer Sager) – 3:29
 From the Buster Soundtrack, and a #1 single in the U.S. in 1988.
"Everyday" – 5:42
 From the album "Both Sides", and a Top 20 hit in the UK in 1994.
"Don't Let Him Steal Your Heart Away" – 4:46
 From the album Hello, I Must Be Going!, and released as a single in 1983.
 Released again as a single from 'Love Songs', it reached #5 on the Billboard Adult Contemporary chart in 2005.
"Please Come Out Tonight" – 5:47
 From the album Both Sides.
"This Must Be Love" – 3:36
 From the album Face Value. This version has an earlier fade-out.
"It's in Your Eyes" – 3:03
 From the album Dance Into the Light, and released as a single in 1997. This is a sped up version.
"Can't Stop Loving You" (Billy Nicholls) – 4:18
 From the album Testify, and released as a single in 2002.

Disc two
"Testify" – 6:31
 From the album Testify.
"True Colors" [Rehearsal] (Billy Steinberg, Tom Kelly)* – 5:32
 A previously unreleased rehearsal on 5 July 2004, at the Zenith, Toulouse, France of a cover of the Cyndi Lauper hit, which was released as a single by Phil Collins in its own right in 1998, as part of his Hits album.
"You'll Be in My Heart" – 4:17
 From the Tarzan Soundtrack, and a Top 20 hit single in the UK in 1999. First time available on a Phil Collins album.
"If Leaving Me Is Easy" – 4:55
 From the album Face Value, and a UK Top 20 hit single in 1981.
"I've Been Trying" (Curtis Mayfield) – 5:00
 From the album A Tribute to Curtis Mayfield (1994). First time available on a Phil Collins album.
"I've Forgotten Everything" – 4:36
 From the album Both Sides. This is a sped up version.
"Somewhere" (Music: Leonard Bernstein, Lyrics: Stephen Sondheim) – 4:01
 From the album The Songs of West Side Story (1996). First time available on a Phil Collins album. This is the shortened "Radio version Edit" of the original 5:37 album track.
"The Least You Can Do" (Music: Daryl Stuermer, Lyrics: Collins) – 5:04
 From the album Testify, and released as a single in 2003. The version on this compilation is a remix.
"Two Hearts" (Collins, Lamont Dozier) – 3:24
 From the Buster soundtrack, and a #1 hit single in the U.S. in 1989.
"Separate Lives" [Live] (Stephen Bishop) – 5:18
 A live rendition of the original American #1 hit single from 1985, recorded live as a duet with Bridgette Bryant and taken from the album Serious Hits... Live!.
"My Girl" [Live] (Smokey Robinson) – 3:49
 A 1994 live cover of the Temptations U.S. #1 single, previously released only on the limited-edition EP "Live from the Board" (1995). First time available on a Phil Collins album.
"Always" [Live] (Irving Berlin) – 4:37
 A 1990 live cover of the Irving Berlin song. Previously available only as the B-side of the "Both Sides of the Story" single in 1993. First time available on a Phil Collins album.
"The Way You Look Tonight" [Live] (Music: Jerome Kern, Lyrics: Dorothy Fields) – 4:04
 A 1998 live cover of the classic from Great American Songbook. Previously unreleased.

Charts and certifications

Weekly charts

Year-end charts

Certifications

References 

Phil Collins compilation albums
2004 compilation albums
Atlantic Records compilation albums
Rhino Entertainment compilation albums